Judson Fabian Kirke (June 16, 1888 – August 31, 1968) was an American professional baseball first baseman. He played in Major League Baseball (MLB) from 1910 through 1918 for the Detroit Tigers, Boston Rustlers / Braves, Cleveland Naps / Indians, and New York Giants.  In 1,148 big league at bats, Kirke had a solid career batting average of .301 while playing seven different positions, primarily first base.  Kirke enjoyed a long minor league career after his final stint in the big leagues with the New York Giants.

External links

1888 births
1968 deaths
Baseball players from New York (state)
Beaumont Exporters players
Binghamton Bingoes players
Boston Braves players
Boston Rustlers players
Cleveland Bearcats players
Cleveland Indians players
Cleveland Naps players
Cleveland Spiders (minor league) players
Decatur Commodores players
Detroit Tigers players
Elmira Colonels players
Fort Worth Panthers players
Gloversville-Johnstown Jags players
Indianapolis Indians players
Kingston Colonials players
Louisville Colonels (minor league) players
Major League Baseball first basemen
Major League Baseball outfielders
Milwaukee Brewers (minor league) players
Minneapolis Millers (baseball) players
Minor league baseball managers
New York Giants (NL) players
New Orleans Pelicans (baseball) players
Opelousas Indians players
People from Delaware County, New York
Poughkeepsie Colts players
Scranton Miners players
Shreveport Sports players
Toledo Mud Hens players
Wheeling Stogies players
Wilkes-Barre Barons (baseball) players
Wilmington Peaches players